RMS Amazon was a transatlantic Royal Mail Ship that the Royal Mail Steam Packet Company operated on scheduled services between Southampton and South American ports including Buenos Aires. She was the second of the RMSP's fleet of "A" series liners, and was launched in 1906.

Building
RMSP ordered Amazon in or shortly after November 1904. Harland and Wolff built her on slip number 6 of its south yard in Belfast. She was launched on 24 February 1906 and completed in 5 June 1906.

Amazon had twin screws, each driven by a quadruple expansion steam engine.

RMSP registered Amazon at Belfast. Her UK official number was 120715 and her code letters were HGKN.

Service
Amazons regular route was between Southampton and ports in the Río de la Plata.

In 1908 Amazon undertook a 17-day cruise to Norway. This was RMSP's first ever "single ship" cruise, in which passengers remained aboard one ship for their entire holiday. In 1909 Amazon ran a series of cruises to Norway. In subsequent years RMSP used her larger sister ship Avon for cruises instead.

By 1913 Amazon was equipped for wireless telegraphy, operating on the 300 and 600 metre wavelengths. Her call sign was MBZ.

By 1918 Amazon was operating from Liverpool instead of Southampton.

Loss
On 14 March 1918 Amazon left Liverpool for Brazil with 24 passengers and without a naval escort. She sailed at reduced speed due to thick fog. At 0930 hrs on 15 March she was zigzagging in the Western Approaches off County Donegal when  hit her with one torpedo in her bunker and her number four hold.

Amazon sank stern first in 15 minutes. The Royal Navy destroyer  rescued all her passengers and crew, sank U-110 with depth charges and rescued nine of the U-boat's 48 crew.

Wreck

References

Bibliography

1906 ships
Maritime incidents in 1918
Ocean liners of the United Kingdom
Ships built in Belfast
Ships built by Harland and Wolff
Ships of the Royal Mail Steam Packet Company
Ships sunk by German submarines in World War I
Ships sunk with no fatalities
Shipwrecks of Ireland
Steamships of the United Kingdom
World War I passenger ships of the United Kingdom
World War I shipwrecks in the Atlantic Ocean